Cocker Spaniels are dogs belonging to two breeds of the spaniel dog type: the American Cocker Spaniel and the English Cocker Spaniel of which are commonly called simply Cocker Spaniel in their countries of origin. In the early 20th century, Cocker Spaniels also included small hunting spaniels.

Cocker Spaniels were originally bred as hunting dogs in the UK, with the term "cocker" deriving from their use to hunt the Eurasian woodcock. When the breed was brought to the United States, it was bred to a different standard, which enabled it to specialize in hunting the American woodcock. Further physical changes were bred into the cocker in the United States during the early part of the 20th century.

Spaniels were first mentioned in the 14th century by Gaston III, Count of Foix in his work the Livre de Chasse. The "cocking" or "cocker spaniel" was a type of field or land spaniel in the 19th century. Prior to 1901, Cocker Spaniels were only separated from Field Spaniels and Springer Spaniels by weight. Two dogs are considered to be the foundation sires of both modern breeds, the English variety are descended from Ch. Obo, while the American breed descends from Obo's son, Ch. Obo II. In the United States, the English Cocker was recognized as separate from the native breed in 1946; in the UK, the American type was recognized as a separate breed in 1970. In addition, a second strain of English Cocker Spaniel, a working strain, is not bred to a standard, but to working ability. Both breeds share similar coat colors and health issues with a few exceptions.

History

While their origins are unknown, "spaynels" are mentioned in 14th-century writings. They are commonly assumed to have originated in Spain, and Edward, 2nd Duke of York in his 15th-century work The Master of Game introduces them as "Another kind of hound there is that be called hounds for the hawk and spaniels, for their kind cometh from Spain, notwithstanding that there are many in other countries." The Master of Game was mostly an English translation of an earlier 14th century Old French work by Gaston III of Foix-Béarn entitled Livre de Chasse.

In 1801, Sydenham Edwards wrote in Cynographia Britannica that the "Land Spaniel" is divided into two types: the hawking, springing/springer and the cocking/cocker spaniel. The term "cocker" came from the dog's use in hunting woodcocks. During the 19th century, a "cocker spaniel" was a type of small Field Spaniel; at the time, this term referred to a number of different spaniel hunting breeds, including the Norfolk Spaniel, Sussex Spaniel, and Clumber Spaniel. While no Sussex Cockers or Clumber Cockers existed, some dogs were known as Welsh Cockers and Devonshire Cockers. The Welsh or Devonshire were considered cockers until 1903, when they were recognized by The Kennel Club as the Welsh Springer Spaniel.

This maximum weight limit remained on the Cocker Spaniel until 1900, with larger dogs being classed as Springer Spaniels. The colors of the Devonshire and Welsh Cockers were described by John Henry Walsh under the pseudonym Stonehenge in his book The Dog in Health and Disease as being a deeper shade of liver than that of the Sussex Spaniel. Following the formation of The Kennel Club in the UK in 1873, efforts were made by breeders to record the pedigrees of cockers and springers. In 1892, English Cocker Spaniels and English Springer Spaniels were recognized as separate breeds by The Kennel Club.

Two dogs are thought to be the foundation sires of both modern breeds of cocker spaniels. Ch. Obo is considered by breed enthusiasts to be the father of the modern English Cocker Spaniel, while his son, Ch. Obo II, is considered to be the progenitor of the American Cocker Spaniel. Obo was born in 1879, when registration as a cocker was still only by size and not by ancestry. He was the son of a Sussex Spaniel and a Field Spaniel. Although Obo was an English dog, Obo II was born on American shores – his mother was shipped to the United States while pregnant. During his lifetime, Obo II was claimed in advertisements to be the sire or grandsire of nearly every prize-winning cocker in America.

Modern breeds

The two breeds of cocker spaniel are the English Cocker Spaniel and the American Cocker Spaniel. They were bred as gun dogs, to use their sense of smell to cover low areas near the handler to flush birds into the air to be shot, and to use their eyes and nose to locate the bird once downed, and then to retrieve the bird with a soft mouth. The major differences between the English and American varieties is that the American is smaller with a shorter back, a domed head, and a shorter muzzle, while the English variety is taller with a narrower head and chest.

Cocker Spaniel coats occur in a variety of colors, including black, liver, red, and golden in solids. Also, black and tan, and sometimes liver and tan are known, as well as a variety of color mixtures of those solid colors including roans, roan and tans, tricolors, and those solid colors with additional white markings.

Rare colours can appear unexpectedly in certain lines, for instance while an all-white cocker is usually bred by selective breeding of very light golden strains, they can still appear very uncommonly to parents that are dark-colored. A noted occurrence of this happened in 1943, when a grandson of My Own Brucie, Best in Show at the Westminster Kennel Club Dog Show in 1940 and 1941, was born all-white.

In its native United States, the American Cocker Spaniel was ranked the 23rd-most popular breed according to registration statistics of the AKC in 2009, a decrease in popularity since 1999, when it was ranked 13th. For 25 years, the American Cocker Spaniel was the most popular dog in America. It was ranked number one first in 1936 prior to the English Cocker Spaniel being recognized as a separate breed, and held onto the spot until 1952, when Beagles became the most popular dogs. It regained the spot in 1983 and held on at number one until 1990. In the UK, the American Cocker Spaniel is far less popular than its English relative, with 322 registrations compared to the English Cocker's 22,211 in 2009.

English Cocker Spaniel

Called simply Cocker Spaniel in the UK, this is the breed that was originally recognized by The Kennel Club (KC) in 1892. The American Kennel Club (AKC) recognized the English Cocker Spaniel as a separate breed in 1946.

The weight of a show dog should be .

The English Cocker Spaniel is the most successful breed at the most popular dog show in the UK, Crufts, with seven best-in-show wins since the prize was first awarded in 1928. This was mostly due to the success of dog breeder H.S. Lloyd's Ware Kennel, dogs of which won best-in-show on six occasions between 1930–1950. They are the second most popular dog breed in the UK according to statistics released by the KC with 22,211 registrations in 2009, beaten only by the Labrador Retriever with 40,943. In third place was the English Springer Spaniel with 12,700. The English Cocker's popularity has increased steadily since 1999 in the United States when they were ranked 76th in registrations by the AKC, to 2009 when they were ranked 66th.

Physical differences exist between the show strain and working strain in the UK. While the show strain is bred to the conformation standard, the working strain is bred for working ability, and as such, several physical differences have appeared. Working-type dogs tend to be larger with flatter heads and shorter ears. The coat also tends to be shorter and finer than the show variety and have less feathering. The working strain seems to be more energetic than the show strain.

American Cocker Spaniel

American Cocker Spaniels were recognized by the AKC in 1878. Generally smaller than the English, separate classes were created for the two types in America in 1935 and the Cocker Spaniel Club of America discouraged breeding between the two types in 1938. The American Cocker Spaniel was recognized as a separate breed by the KC in the UK in 1970. The American Cocker Spaniel is referred to as the Cocker Spaniel within the United States.

The American Cocker Spaniel was bred smaller, as American woodcocks are smaller than their European relatives, and the breed's appearance changed slightly during the first part of the 20th century, as the preference by American breeders was for a more stylish appearance.

At the Westminster Kennel Club Dog Show, the most prestigious dog show in the United States, the American Cocker Spaniel has won Best in Show on four occasions since its first award in 1907. The most successful breed is the Wire Fox Terrier with 13 wins. The American Cocker Spaniel is judged in three separate breed classes under AKC rules; "black", "parti-color", and "any solid color other than black..." (ASCOB).

See also
 Dogs portal
 List of dog breeds

References
Footnotes

Bibliography

External links

 
 
 

Dog types
Spaniels